The 1962 Delaware State Hornets football team represented Delaware State College—now known as Delaware State University—as a member of the Central Intercollegiate Athletic Association (CIAA) in the 1962 NCAA College Division football season. Led by coach Roy D. Moore in his third season, the Hornets compiled a 4–5 record, 3–4 in their conference.

Schedule

References

Delaware State
Delaware State Hornets football seasons
Delaware State Hornets football